Grimsay is a tidal island in the Outer Hebrides of Scotland.

Geography
Grimsay is the largest of the low-lying stepping-stones which convey the Oitir Mhòr (North Ford) causeway, a  arc of single track road linking North Uist and Benbecula via the western tip of Grimsay. Until it opened in 1960, a ferry linked Carinish (on North Uist) with Gramsdale (on Benbecula), but could only operate at high tide. There was also a ford which could only be crossed close to low water, usually only with a guide. For significant parts of each day the North Ford was too wet to ford and not wet enough to cross by ferry. East of Grimsay lie several smaller islands including Ronay which was inhabited until 1931.

Inhabitants
The island's population was 169 as recorded by the 2011 census a drop of over 15% since 2001 when there were 201 usual residents. During the same period Scottish island populations as a whole grew by 4% to 103,702. The main settlements are Baymore (Bàgh Mòr) and Kallin (Ceallan) at the eastern end of the island. Grimsay has a harbour at Kallin, which is the base to a sizeable shellfish industry, the island's main industry, mostly for lobster, prawns and scallops. Also in Kallin is The Boatshed, a marine repair facility which promotes traditional skills, and employs a full-time boatbuilder and trainee. Three generations of Stewart family built as many as 1,000 boats from three sheds on Grimsay. Grimsay is encircled by a single-track road that links most of the island's small croft and fishing settlements together.

History
There is a fine example of an Iron-Age wheelhouse on the northeast coast of the island at Bagh nam Feadag. It is one of the best examples of a wheelhouse on North Uist but does not appear on Ordnance Survey maps.

See also 

 List of islands of Scotland

Footnotes

Uist islands
Tidal islands of Scotland